is a Japanese judoka.
She started judo at the age of 3 under the instruction of her father, Mikio Asami who was former −60 kg and −65 kg national champion.

She won the gold medal in the extra-lightweight (−48 kg) division at the World Judo Championships in 2010 and 2011.

Her favorite techniques are Kosoto gari, Seoi nage and Tai otoshi.

Results

2008
 All Japan Judo Championships -48 kg, Fukuoka
 Grand Slam -48 kg, Tokyo
2009
 World Cup -48 kg, Sofia
 World Cup -48 kg, Vienna
 Grand Prix -48 kg, Tunis
 Summer Universiade -48 kg, Belgrade
 East Asian Games -48 kg, Hong Kong
 All Japan Judo Championships -48 kg, Fukuoka
2010
 World Championships -48 kg, Tokyo
 World Masters -48 kg, Suwon
 World Cup -48 kg, Budapest
 World Cup -48 kg, Ulan Bator
 Grand Prix -48 kg, Düsseldorf
 All Japan Judo Championships -48 kg, Fukuoka
2011
 World Championships -48 kg, Paris
 World Masters -48 kg, Baku
 Grand Slam -48 kg, Paris
 Grand Slam -48 kg, Rio de Janeiro
 Grand Slam -48 kg, Tokyo
 All Japan Judo Championships -48 kg, Fukuoka
2012
 Grand Slam -48 kg, Tokyo
 World Masters -48 kg, Almaty
2013
 Grand Slam -48 kg, Paris
 All Japan Judo Championships -48 kg, Fukuoka
 World Championships -48 kg, Rio de Janeiro

References

External links
 

1988 births
Living people
People from Iyo, Ehime
Japanese female judoka
Universiade medalists in judo
Universiade gold medalists for Japan
Medalists at the 2009 Summer Universiade
20th-century Japanese women
21st-century Japanese women